Coleophora bispinatella is a moth of the family Coleophoridae. It is found in Canada, including Nova Scotia.

The larvae feed on the seeds of Juncus canadensis. They create a trivalved, tubular silken case.

References

bispinatella
Moths described in 1954
Moths of North America